Iodomethane, also called methyl iodide, and commonly abbreviated "MeI", is the chemical compound with the formula CH3I.  It is a dense, colorless, volatile liquid.  In terms of chemical structure, it is related to methane by replacement of one hydrogen atom by an atom of iodine. It is naturally emitted by rice plantations in small amounts. It is also produced in vast quantities estimated to be greater than 214,000 tons annually by algae and kelp in the world's temperate oceans, and in lesser amounts on land by terrestrial fungi and bacteria. It is used in organic synthesis as a source of methyl groups.

Preparation and handling
Iodomethane is formed via the exothermic reaction that occurs when iodine is added to a mixture of methanol with red phosphorus.  The iodinating reagent is phosphorus triiodide that is formed in situ:
3 CH3OH  +  PI3  →  3 CH3I  +  H2PO3H

Alternatively, it is prepared from the reaction of dimethyl sulfate with potassium iodide in the presence of calcium carbonate:

(CH3O)2SO2  +  KI  →  CH3I  +  CH3OSO2OK

Iodomethane can also be prepared by the reaction of methanol with aqueous hydrogen iodide:
 CH3OH + HI  →  CH3I + H2O
The generated iodomethane can be distilled from the reaction mixture.

Iodomethane may also be prepared by treating iodoform with potassium hydroxide and dimethyl sulfate under 95% ethanol.

Storage and purification
Like many organoiodide compounds, iodomethane is typically stored in dark bottles to inhibit degradation caused by light to give iodine, giving degraded samples a purplish tinge. Commercial samples may be stabilized by copper or silver wire. It can be purified by washing with Na2S2O3 to remove iodine followed by distillation.

Biogenic iodomethane
Most iodomethane is produced by microbial methylation of iodide.  Oceans are the major source, but rice paddies are also significant.

Reactions

Methylation reagent
Iodomethane is an excellent substrate for SN2 substitution reactions. It is sterically open for attack by nucleophiles, and iodide is a good leaving group. It is used for alkylating carbon, oxygen, sulfur, nitrogen, and phosphorus nucleophiles. Unfortunately, it has a high equivalent weight: one mole of iodomethane weighs almost three times as much as one mole of chloromethane and nearly 1.5 times as much as one mole of bromomethane. On the other hand, chloromethane and bromomethane are gaseous, thus harder to handle, and are also weaker alkylating agents. Iodide can act as a catalyst when reacting chloromethane or bromomethane with a nucleophile while iodomethane is formed in situ.

Iodides are generally expensive relative to the more common chlorides and bromides, though iodomethane is reasonably affordable; on a commercial scale, the more toxic dimethyl sulfate is preferred, since it is cheap and has a higher boiling point.  The iodide leaving group in iodomethane may cause unwanted side reactions.  Finally, being highly reactive, iodomethane is more dangerous for laboratory workers than related chlorides and bromides.

For example, it can be used for the methylation of carboxylic acids or phenols:

In these examples, the base (K2CO3 or Li2CO3) removes the acidic proton to form the carboxylate or phenoxide anion, which serves as the nucleophile in the SN2 substitution.

Iodide is a "soft" anion which means that methylation with MeI tends to occur at the "softer" end of an ambidentate nucleophile.  For example, reaction with thiocyanate ion favours attack at sulfur rather than "hard" nitrogen, leading mainly to methyl thiocyanate (CH3SCN) rather than methyl isothiocyanate CH3NCS.  This behavior is relevant to the methylation of stabilized enolates such as those derived from 1,3-dicarbonyl compounds.  Methylation of these and related enolates can occur on the harder oxygen atom or the (usually desired) carbon atom. With iodomethane, C-alkylation nearly always predominates.

Other reactions
In the Monsanto process and the Cativa process, MeI forms in situ from the reaction of methanol and hydrogen iodide.  The CH3I then reacts with carbon monoxide in the presence of a rhodium or iridium complex to form acetyl iodide, the precursor to acetic acid after hydrolysis.  The Cativa process is usually preferred because less water is required to use and there are less byproducts.

MeI is used to prepare the Grignard reagent, methylmagnesium iodide ("MeMgI"), a common source of "Me−". The use of MeMgI has been somewhat superseded by the commercially available methyllithium. MeI can also be used to prepare dimethylmercury, by reacting 2 moles of MeI with a 2/1-molar sodium amalgam (2 moles of sodium, 1 mol of mercury).

Iodomethane and other organic iodine compounds do form under the conditions of a serious nuclear accident, after both Chernobyl and Fukushima, Iodine-131 was detected in organic iodine compounds in Europe and Japan respectively.

Use as a pesticide
Iodomethane had also been proposed for use as a fungicide, herbicide, insecticide, nematicide, and as a soil disinfectant, replacing methyl bromide (also known as bromomethane) (banned under the Montreal Protocol). Manufactured by Arysta LifeScience and sold under the brand name MIDAS, iodomethane is registered as a pesticide in the U.S., Mexico, Morocco, Japan, Turkey, and New Zealand and registration is pending in Australia, Guatemala, Costa Rica, Chile, Egypt, Israel, South Africa and other countries. The first commercial applications of MIDAS soil fumigant in California began in Fresno County, in May, 2011.

Iodomethane had been approved for use as a pesticide by the United States Environmental Protection Agency in 2007 as a pre-plant biocide used to control insects, plant parasitic nematodes, soil borne pathogens, and weed seeds. The compound was registered for use as a preplant soil treatment for field grown strawberries, peppers, tomatoes, grape vines, ornamentals and turf and nursery grown strawberries, stone fruits, tree nuts, and conifer trees.  After the discovery phase in a consumer lawsuit, the manufacturer withdrew the fumigant citing its lack of market viability.

The use of iodomethane as a fumigant has drawn concern. For example, 54 chemists and physicians contacted the U.S. EPA in a letter, saying "We are skeptical of U.S. EPA's conclusion that the high levels of exposure to iodomethane that are likely to result from broadcast applications are 'acceptable' risks. U.S. EPA has made many assumptions about toxicology and exposure in the risk assessment that have not been examined by independent scientific peer reviewers for adequacy or accuracy. Additionally, none of U.S. EPA's calculations account for the extra vulnerability of the unborn fetus and children to toxic insults."  EPA Assistant Administrator Jim Gulliford replied saying, "We are confident that by conducting such a rigorous analysis and developing highly restrictive provisions governing its use, there will be no risks of concern," and in October the EPA approved the use of iodomethane as a soil fumigant in the United States.

The California Department of Pesticide Regulation (DPR) concluded that iodomethane is "highly toxic," that "any anticipated scenario for the agricultural or structural fumigation use of this agent would result in exposures to a large number of the public and thus would have a significant adverse impact on the public health", and that adequate control of the chemical in these circumstances would be "difficult, if not impossible." Iodomethane was approved as a pesticide in California that December. A lawsuit was filed on January 5, 2011, challenging California's approval of iodomethane. Subsequently, the manufacturer withdrew the fumigant and requested that California Department of Pesticide Regulation cancel its California registration, citing its lack of market viability.

Safety

Toxicity and biological effects
According to the United States Department of Agriculture iodomethane exhibits moderate to high
acute toxicity for inhalation and ingestion.  The Centers for Disease Control and Prevention (CDC) lists inhalation, skin absorption, ingestion, and eye contact as possible exposure routes with target organs of the eyes, skin, respiratory system, and the central nervous system. Symptoms may include eye irritation, nausea, vomiting, dizziness, ataxia, slurred speech, and dermatitis. In high dose acute toxicity, as may occur in industrial accidents, toxicity includes metabolic disturbance, renal failure, venous and arterial thrombosis and encephalopathy with seizures and coma, with a characteristic pattern of brain injury.

In its risk assessment of iodomethane, the U.S. EPA conducted an exhaustive scientific and medical literature search over the past 100 years for reported cases of human poisonings attributable to the compound. Citing the EPA as its source, the California Department of Pesticide Regulation concluded, "Over the past century, only 11 incidents of iodomethane poisoning have been reported in the published literature." (Hermouet, C. et al. 1996 & Appel, G.B. et al. 1975) "An updated literature search on May 30, 2007 for iodomethane poisoning produced only one additional case report." (Schwartz MD, et al. 2005). All but one were industrial—not agricultural—accidents, and the remaining case of poisoning was an apparent suicide. Iodomethane is routinely and regularly used in industrial processes as well as in most university and college chemistry departments for study and learning related to a variety of organic chemical reactions.

Carcinogenicity in mammals
It is considered a potential occupational carcinogen by the U.S. National Institute for Occupational Safety and Health (NIOSH), the U.S. Occupational Safety and Health Administration and the U.S. Centers for Disease Control and Prevention.  The International Agency for Research on Cancer concluded based on studies performed after methyl iodide was Proposition 65 listed that: "Methyl iodide is not classifiable as to its carcinogenicity to humans (Group 3)."  the Environmental Protection Agency classifies it as "not likely to be carcinogenic to humans in the absence of altered thyroid hormone homeostasis," i.e. it is a human carcinogen but only at doses large enough to disrupt thyroid function (via excess iodide). However this finding is disputed by the Pesticide Action Network which states that the  EPA's cancer rating  "appears to be based solely on a single rat inhalation study in which 66% of the control group and 54-62% of the rats in the other groups died before the end of
the study". They go on to state: "The EPA appears to be dismissing early peer-reviewed studies in favor of two nonpeer-reviewed studies conducted by the registrant that are flawed in design and execution." Despite requests by the U.S. EPA to the Pesticide Action Network to bring forth scientific evidence of their claims, they have not done so.

References

Additional sources
 
 Sulikowski, G. A.; Sulikowski, M. M. (1999). in Coates, R.M.; Denmark, S. E. (Eds.) Handbook of Reagents for Organic Synthesis, Volume 1: Reagents, Auxiliaries and Catalysts for C-C Bond Formation New York: Wiley, pp. 423–26.

External links
 
 

 IARC Summaries & Evaluations: Vol. 15 (1977), Vol. 41 (1986), Vol. 71 (1999)
 Metabolism of iodomethane in the rat
 Iodomethane NMR spectra
 
 

Iodoalkanes
Halomethanes
Methylating agents
IARC Group 3 carcinogens
Environmental controversies
Environmental effects of pesticides
Pesticides in the United States
Halogen-containing natural products
Iodine-containing natural products